The 1977 Ole Miss Rebels football team represented the University of Mississippi (Ole Miss) in the 1977 NCAA Division I football season as a member of the Southeastern Conference (SEC). The team was led by head coach Ken Cooper, in his fourth year, and played their home games at Hemingway Stadium in Oxford, the Mississippi Memorial Stadium in Jackson, Mississippi and Liberty Bowl Memorial Stadium in Memphis, Tennessee. They finished the season with a record of five wins and six losses (5–6 overall, 2–5 in the SEC). In 1978 their record was updated to six wins and five losses (6–5 overall, 3–4 in the SEC) after Mississippi State was forced by the NCAA to forfeit their win over the Rebels for playing an ineligible player.

Schedule

Mississippi State later forfeited its win over Ole Miss due to NCAA infractions.

Personnel

Game summaries

Notre Dame

Ole Miss gave eventual national champion Notre Dame its only loss of the season.

References

Ole Miss
Ole Miss Rebels football seasons
Ole Miss Rebels football